Rishod Sobirov (born 11 September 1986) is an Uzbek judoka. He won the bronze medal in the Men's 60 kg at the 2008 Summer Olympics and two World Judo Championships in 2010 and 2011, making him the current number one in the International Judo Federation ranking of Men's 60.

Sobirov won a bronze medal in the men's under 60 kg division at the 2012 Summer Olympics in London.

Record against selected opponents
Includes results from the Olympics, World Championships, Asian Championships, World Cup, and Grand Prix Series events from 2006 to the present.

  Elio Verde 7–0
  Hiroaki Hiraoka 4–3
  Sofiane Milous 4–0
  Beslan Mudranov 4–0
  Georgii Zantaraia 3–2
  Choi Min Ho 1–1
  Omar Rebahi 1–0
  Pavel Petřikov 1–0
  Masoud Haji Akhound Zade 1–0
  Will Frazer 2–0
  Dmitri Dragin 2–0
  Yano Daichi 1–0
  Tobias Englmaier 2–1
  Amiran Papinashvili 1–0
  Levan Chubinadze 1–0
  Eisa Hassan Majrashi 1–0
  Ludwig Paischer 1–0
  David Asumbani 0–1
  Masaaki Fukuoka 1–0
  Sergio Pessoa 1–0
  Jeroen Mooren 2–0
  Yanislav Gerchev 1–0
  Jang Jin Ming 1–0
  Mohsen Ali Khousrof 1–0

References

External links
 
 
 
 
 Athlete bio at official Olympics site

Living people
Uzbekistani male judoka
Judoka at the 2008 Summer Olympics
Judoka at the 2012 Summer Olympics
Judoka at the 2016 Summer Olympics
Olympic judoka of Uzbekistan
Olympic bronze medalists for Uzbekistan
1986 births
Olympic medalists in judo
People from Bukhara Region
World judo champions
Medalists at the 2008 Summer Olympics
Medalists at the 2012 Summer Olympics
Medalists at the 2016 Summer Olympics
Asian Games medalists in judo
Judoka at the 2010 Asian Games
Judoka at the 2014 Asian Games
Asian Games gold medalists for Uzbekistan
Asian Games bronze medalists for Uzbekistan
Medalists at the 2010 Asian Games
Medalists at the 2014 Asian Games
21st-century Uzbekistani people